Peter Shawhan is an American physicist. He is currently professor of physics at the University of Maryland and was a co-recipient of the Breakthrough Prize in Fundamental Physics, the Gruber Prize in Cosmology, and the Bruno Rossi Prize for his work on LIGO.

Biography 
Shawhan received his bachelor's degree in physics in 1990 summa cum laude from Washington University in St. Louis, where he was an Arthur Holly Compton Fellow in the Physical Sciences and Mathematics. He was a National Science Foundation Graduate Research Fellow at the University of Chicago, where he received his Ph.D. in 1999 under the supervision of Bruce Winstein. He was then a Millikan Prize Postdoctoral Fellow and a Senior Scientist at Caltech before becoming Professor of Physics at the University of Maryland, College Park. 

He works on LIGO and is chair of the Division of Gravitational Physics of the American Physical Society.

Awards 

 Special Breakthrough Prize in Fundamental Physics (2016)
 Gruber Prize in Cosmology (2016)
 Bruno Rossi Prize (2017)
 Princess of Asturias Award for Scientific and Technical Research
 Kirwan Faculty Research and Scholarship Prize, University of Maryland (2018)
 Fellow, American Physical Society (2019)

References 

Washington University physicists
Washington University in St. Louis alumni
University of Maryland, College Park faculty
Year of birth missing (living people)
Living people
University of Chicago alumni
American physicists
20th-century American physicists
21st-century American physicists
Fellows of the American Physical Society